Estadio Libertador Simón Bolívar is a multi-use stadium in the Tembladerani neighborhood of the city of La Paz, Bolivia.  It is most often used for football matches, on club level by Club Bolívar.  The stadium has a capacity of 5,000 people. The stadium was founded on the 9th of February 1968, and has been used for FIFA World Cup games.

References

Libertador Simon Bolivar
Buildings and structures in La Paz
Club Bolívar
Buildings and structures in La Paz Department (Bolivia)